Super middleweight, or light cruiserweight, is a weight class in combat sports.

Boxing
The class first appeared in 1967.

History

1960s–1983
There was interest in a division between middleweight and light heavyweight in the late 1960s, the mid-1970s, and the early 1980s. On April 3, 1967, in Salt Lake City, Utah, Don Fullmer, a brother of former world middleweight champion Gene Fullmer, won the first version by stopping previously unbeaten Joe Hopkins in six rounds. He never defended it. On November 25, 1974, in Columbus, Ohio, Billy Douglas, the father of future world heavyweight champion James "Buster" Douglas, halted Danny Brewer in two rounds to win the Ohio Commission's version of the world junior light heavyweight title. He too never made a defense of the title. Then, on April 3, 1982, in Denver, Colorado, Jerry "Wimpy" Halstead stopped Ron Brown in six rounds to win the WAA's inaugural super middleweight title bout. Halstead made one defense, knocking out Darren Encline in one round on May 29, 1982, in Oklahoma City, Oklahoma. Following that fight, Halstead moved up to the light heavyweight class and eventually campaigned as a heavyweight. The media and most commissions did not recognize Fullmer's, Douglas', or Halstead's titles. Nor did they recognize the division during this period.

1984–1989
The current super middleweight division traces its beginning to 1984, when Murray Sutherland defeated Ernie Singletary for the International Boxing Federation version of the title. The World Boxing Association created its version of the super middleweight title when reigning Lineal champion Chong Pal Park defeated Jesus Gallardo in 1987 (Park had been IBF champion before relinquishing the title to fight for the inaugural WBA version).  The World Boxing Council crowned its first champion in 1988 when Sugar Ray Leonard defeated Donny Lalonde in a fight that was also for its version of the light heavyweight title.

1990–2007
Since the early 1990s, there has been a highly competitive super middleweight division in Britain and Ireland, including the rivalry between Nigel Benn, Chris Eubank, and Michael Watson, which included two memorable fights and the tragic injury to Watson, followed by the emergence of Steve Collins, who defeated Benn and Eubank, before retiring and vacating the title, as well as the 10-year reign of Joe Calzaghe. In addition, fellow Brits Richie Woodhall and Robin Reid also held versions of the title between 1996–97 and 1997–98. During this decade, Americans James Toney and Roy Jones Jr. also reigned as champions. In 2007, two champions of the division, the undefeated Calzaghe and the likewise undefeated Mikkel Kessler, had a title unification fight which Calzaghe won by a unanimous decision to become the unified super middleweight champion of the world.

2008–present
At the end of the 2000s and start of the 2010s the division was one of the most active in boxing with the likes of Lucian Bute, Andre Ward, Andre Dirrell, Carl Froch, Mikkel Kessler, Anthony Mundine, Arthur Abraham, Robert Stieglitz, Sakio Bika, Allan Green, Jesse Brinkley, Librado Andrade, Edison Miranda and Jermain Taylor. This was showcased with Showtime's, Super Six World Boxing Classic that sought out to find the best super middleweight in the world at the time. Andre Ward went on to defeat Carl Froch by unanimous decision and win the tournament in late 2011.

On November 6, 2021, Canelo Álvarez became the first undisputed champion of the division.

Current world champions

Current world interim champions

Current world rankings

The Ring
As of December 10, 2022.

Keys:
 Current The Ring world champion

BoxRec
.

Longest reigning world super middleweight champions
Below is a list of longest reigning super middleweight champions in boxing measured by the individual's longest reign. Career total time as champion (for multiple title reigns) does not apply.

 Active reign
 Reign has ended

Kickboxing
 International Kickboxing Federation (IKF) Super Middleweight (Pro & Amateur) 165.1 - 172 lb (75.1 - 78.2 kg)

Mixed martial arts

In MMA, the Super middleweight division is from 186 lbs (84 kg) to 195 lb (88 kg).

References 

Boxing weight classes
Kickboxing weight classes